Walcha Shire is a local government area located in the New England region of New South Wales, Australia. The shire was formed on 1 June 1955 through the amalgamation of Apsley Shire and the Municipality of Walcha.

The mayor of Walcha Shire Council is Cr. James Fermanis an unaligned politician.

Main towns and villages
The towns and villages of Walcha Council include Walcha, Walcha Road, Niangala, Nowendoc and Woolbrook. Settlements include: Brackendale, Yarrowitch, Tia and Bendemeer.

Demographics

Incomes
According to the Australian Bureau of Statistics during 2003–04, there:
were 927 wage and salary earners (ranked 146th in New South Wales and 470th in Australia, less than 0.1% of both New South Wales's 2,558,415 and Australia's 7,831,856)
was a total income of $27,787,248 (around $28 million) (ranked 147th in New South Wales and 478th in Australia, less than 0.1% of both New South Wales's $107 billion and Australia's $304 billion)
was an estimated average income per wage and salary earner of $29,975 (ranked 153rd in New South Wales and 517th in Australia, 72% of New South Wales's $41,407 and 77% of Australia's $38,820)
was an estimated median income per wage and salary earner of $27,590 (ranked 154th in New South Wales and 517th in Australia, 78% of New South Wales's $35,479 and 81% of Australia's $34,149).

Heritage listings
There are heritage listings in Walcha, Walcha Road, and in Woolbrook.

The heritage-listed sites in Walcha are:
 Ohio Homestead
 South Street: St Andrew's Anglican Church
 Thee Street: St Andrew's Anglican Rectory

 Main Northern railway: Walcha Road railway station

 Woolbrook rail bridge over Macdonald River

Council

Current composition and election method
Walcha Shire Council is composed of eight councillors elected proportionally as four separate wards, each electing two councillors. All councillors are elected for a fixed four-year term of office. The mayor is by the councillors at the first meeting of the council. The most recent election was held on 10 September 2016. The makeup of the council is as follows:

The current Council, elected in 2016, in order of election by ward, is:

At the 2012 local government elections, a referendum to abolish the four wards and elect councillors as one entire ward was defeated, with 56.1% voting against the resolution.

History
The Shire of Apsley, its predecessor, was constituted by proclamation on 7 March 1906 and is located in the Vernon, Hawes, and Inglis counties, and comprises about 60 parishes. The Shire of Walcha was constituted by the union of the Municipality of Walcha and the Shire of Apsley on 1 June 1955.

On 28 and 29 November 2008, torrential rain that caused severe flooding in the Apsley River and Macdonald River led to the area being declared a natural disaster area. Walcha Council estimated that it will cost approximately $1.7 million to repair damage caused to roads and infrastructure across the shire.

Proposed amalgamation
A 2015 review of local government boundaries recommended that the Walcha Shire merge with adjoining councils. The government considered two proposals. An alternative proposal, submitted by the Armidale Dumaresq Council on 1 March 2016, was for an amalgamation of the Armidale Dumaresq, Guyra, Uralla and Walcha councils. On 12 May 2016, the merger proposal was struck down – leaving Walcha Council to stand alone as a solo entity.

References 

 
Local government areas of New South Wales
New England (New South Wales)
1955 establishments in Australia